Molo is a town in Nakuru County. It is served by a branch of Kenya Railways, formerly the Uganda Railway, East African Railways Corporation until 1977. Molo hosts a town council. The town has a population of 156,732 (2019 census).

Overview 
Molo is along the Mau Forest which runs on the Mau Escarpment. The town was a settlement established primarily because of its fertility and vast vegetation.  It is one of the coldest places in the country. This is a perfect place for growing Pyrethrum, a cash crop that can be maintained with little resources. There are plenty of other crops that are grown by farmers both small and large scale and attracting settlers, many of them politically empowered. This massive invasion resulted to a high rate of forest destruction and timber poaching.  Efforts to reclaim land and grow trees have been outpaced by logging and charcoal making. The Kenyan government has since declared all forests contained from human activity. Only imported timber is permitted from 2002.

Molo town has seven wards, five of them (Kiambiriria, Molo, Sachangwan, Turi North and Turi South) are within Molo Constituency, while the remaining two (Koige and Sirikwa) are part of the Kuresoi Constituency.

According to the Kenyan National Potato Policy, Molo is the second largest producer of potatoes in Kenya. Baraka Farmers Training College is located just outside Molo.

St. Andrews School, Turi, is located in Turi, a railroad station centre about 10 kilometres towards the east of Molo.

The 2009 Kenyan oil spill ignition occurred near Molo in Sachangwan.

See also 

 Railway stations in Kenya

Statistics 
 Elevation = 2506m

References

External links 
 Molo Town - Kenya
 All about Molo Town

Nakuru County
Populated places in Kenya